Andrés Gimeno Tolaguera (3 August 1937 – 9 October 2019) was a Spanish tennis player. His greatest achievement came in 1972, when he won the French Open and became the oldest first-time Grand Slam champion in the Open era at 34 years of age.

Early years
Andrés came from a family which loved tennis, and his father Esteban supported his efforts to play the game. Esteban had been a good tennis player and he became Andres' coach. They practiced at Real Club de Tenis Barcelona. At an early age Andres started to become a really good tennis player, winning some important tournaments in his region. At age sixteen, he won the U-18 Championship of Spain. In 1954, he won the Championship of Spain in the doubles category playing with Juan Manuel Couder. At the same time, he stopped studying to focus on his tennis career.

He was not only a successful tennis player in Spain, but also represented his country throughout Europe. He played in the Galea's Cup, the European Championship U21, and won it in 1956 and 1957. He was the runner-up in 1958. After that, he decided to go to Australia to play with the man who was considered the best tennis coach in the world, Harry Hopman. He improved his tennis level and soon, he had two important victories in the championships in Perth and in Sydney.

Tennis career
Gimeno went back to Spain in 1960 where he then had his best year as an amateur, winning the titles in Barcelona, Caracas, Monte Carlo, and at Queen's Club. In Barcelona, he became the first Spanish player to win the Torneo Conde de Godó, beating the Italian player Giuseppe Merlo. That same year he reached the doubles final of the French Open too, losing to an Australian duo. After that year, he joined the professional group World Championship Tennis, where Jack Kramer offered him $50,000 for three years, and more money for each victory. The group consisted of some of the best tennis players in history such as Rod Laver, Pancho Gonzales and Ken Rosewall.

Gimeno won the Poertschach pro tournament in August 1963 beating Rosewall and Frank Sedgman. He also won the Genoa Pro in September 1963 beating Laver and Rosewall. Gimeno won the College Park Pro in May 1964 beating Lew Hoad in the final. He won tournaments in Noordwijk and Munich in August and September 1964 beating Laver and Rosewall in both events. Gimeno won the Milan Pro in September 1965 over Laver and Rosewall and beat Laver in the final of the pro event at Port Elizabeth in October 1965. Gimeno won the US Pro hardcourt event at St. Louis in June 1966 beating Laver in the final. He won the World pro championships in Oklahoma City in July 1966 beating Laver and Rosewall. He also won the Geneva and Barcelona pro tournaments in September 1966 (both over Laver). He won the Cincinnati Pro in July 1967 beating Laver and Rosewall. In September 1967, Gimeno won the Border Pro at Selborne (over Rosewall and Fred Stolle) and the Eastern Province Pro at Port Elizabeth (over Laver and Rosewall).

Gimeno's best Grand Slam results as a singles player came in 1968 when the Open era started and the professional could participate in Grand Slams. His first good result was the final in Australian Open in 1969, where he lost to Rod Laver in three sets. Gimeno won events at Barcelona, Cologne and New York in 1969, Dallas in 1970 and Hamburg in 1971.

Gimeno's best year was in 1972, when he was a finalist in Brussels and in Paris, and he won in Los Angeles, in Eastbourne, in Gstaad, and the French Open. The Catalan won his first and only Grand Slam in 1972. He held the record for the oldest male player to win the French Open (at the age of 34) until 2022, and remains the oldest first-time Grand Slam champion. In the final, he beat the French player Patrick Proisy in four sets. In addition, he reached the semifinals at Wimbledon in 1970. In 1973, he reached the final of the Dutch Open in Hilversum, where Tom Okker beat him in five sets.

Gimeno was an active Davis Cup player, recording an 18–5 singles record and 5–5 doubles record. His debut was in the match that Spain played against Egypt with one of the most important players in Spain, Manuel Santana. He could not play the competition while he was a part of the professional group, but he participated as coach in 1966. In 1973, he injured his meniscus and decided to quit playing tennis. He became the tennis coach in the RFET, Tennis' Spanish Federation and then in the Suisse Federation.

After retiring from tennis
After his professional career, he decided to join the tennis circuit for retired players called Legends Championship. He also founded a tennis club in 1974 called "Club de Tenis Andres Gimeno" in Castelldefels, Barcelona.

He was elected to the International Tennis Hall of Fame in 2009, becoming the fourth Spanish tennis player in it, after Arantxa Sánchez Vicario, Manuel Alonso and Manuel Santana.

Personal life
Gimeno married Cristina Corolla in 1962 and together they had three children: Alejo Gimeno, Andres Gimeno Jr. and Cristina Gimeno. In 2011, Gimeno lost all his money, and some of the best Spanish tennis players such as Rafael Nadal, Tommy Robredo, Feliciano López and David Ferrer played an exhibition tennis tournament in Palau Blaugrana to raise funds for him.

Death
Gimeno died following a long illness, on 9 October 2019, at the age of 82.

Grand Slam finals

Singles: 2 (1 title, 1 runner-up)

Doubles: 2 (2 runner-ups)

Stats per ATP website bio

Career finals (Open era)

Singles (11 wins, 13 losses)

Source: ATP

Performance timeline

Professional Grand Slams

Source:

References

External links
 
 
 
 

Tennis players from Catalonia
French Championships junior (tennis) champions
French Open champions
International Tennis Hall of Fame inductees
Spanish male tennis players
Tennis players from Barcelona
1937 births
2019 deaths
Grand Slam (tennis) champions in men's singles
Professional tennis players before the Open Era
Grand Slam (tennis) champions in boys' singles